"A Dose of Rock 'n' Roll" is a song written by Carl Groszman, who at the time was signed to Ringo Starr's record label, Ring O' Records. Starr released his own recording of the song on his 1976 album Ringo's Rotogravure. Also issued as the album's lead single, it became his first hit as an Atlantic Records artist.

Released on 20 September 1976 in advance of the album in the US, the single spent nine weeks on the Billboard charts, peaking at number 26 on the Billboard Hot 100. It was released in the UK on 15 October but failed to chart there.

Record World said that it "marks a return to the goodtime, sing-along style" and that "Peter Frampton adds some spicy guitar licks."

Personnel

References
 Footnotes

 Citations

External links
Allmusic.com

1976 singles
Ringo Starr songs
Songs written by Carl Groszman
Year of song missing
1976 songs